Len Cottrell (born 27 January 1936) is a former Australian rules footballer who played with Carlton in the Victorian Football League (VFL).

Cottrell played with Bethanga in the Tallangatta & District Football League from 1953 to 1955, then played football with Tawonga Football Club in 1956, then with Myrtleford in 1957.

Notes

External links 

Len Cottrell's profile at Blueseum

1936 births
Carlton Football Club players
Living people
Australian rules footballers from Victoria (Australia)
Myrtleford Football Club players